Andrés Iniesta Luján (born 11 May 1984) is a Spanish professional footballer who plays as a midfielder and is the captain of J1 League club Vissel Kobe. Considered one of the greatest midfielders of all time, Iniesta has spent most of his career at Barcelona, where he served as the captain for three seasons.

Iniesta came through La Masia, the Barcelona youth academy, after an early migration from his birthplace, and impressed from an early age. He made his first-team debut aged 18 in 2002. He began playing regularly during the 2004–05 season and remained in the team until 2018. Iniesta was an integral part of the Barcelona sides that won two historic trebles in 2009 and 2015, and his 35 trophies, which includes nine La Ligas and four UEFA Champions League titles, make him the most decorated Spanish footballer of all time. After 22 years at Barcelona, Iniesta signed for Japanese club Vissel Kobe in 2018.

Iniesta played for Spain at the Under-16, Under-19 and Under-21 levels before making his international debut in 2006. He helped Spain win UEFA Euro 2008, playing every game and being selected in the Team of the Tournament. Iniesta was also a key member of the victorious Spanish team at the 2010 FIFA World Cup; he scored the winning goal in the final against the Netherlands, for which he was named the Man of the Match, and was selected to the tournament's All-Star Team. At UEFA Euro 2012, Iniesta led Spain to their second consecutive continental crown, again being chosen as the Man of the Match of the final against Italy, and was named the Player of the Tournament.

Iniesta has been named in the FIFA FIFPro World XI nine times and was chosen in the UEFA Team of the Year on six occasions. He was named in the All-time UEFA Euro XI. He won the UEFA Best Player in Europe Award in 2012 and was named the IFFHS World's Best Playmaker in 2012 and 2013. Iniesta was runner-up to Lionel Messi for the 2010 FIFA Ballon d'Or and achieved third place in 2012.

Club career

FC Barcelona

Early career 
Iniesta comes from Fuentealbilla, a small village in the province of Albacete, Castile–La Mancha, where he mostly played futsal due to the lack of football pitches in the village. At the age of 12, while playing for Albacete Balompié in a junior seven-a-side tournament in Albacete, he attracted the attention of scouts from clubs around Spain. His parents knew Barcelona's youth team coach, Enrique Orizaola, and he persuaded them to consider sending Iniesta to the Barcelona youth academy. Iniesta traveled there with his parents and visited La Masia, the farmhouse where the club houses its young players; the trip convinced them to enroll Iniesta in the Barcelona youth ranks.

Iniesta says he "cried rivers" the day he left for La Masia and struggled being separated from his parents; he was very shy and kept to himself while there. He captained the Barcelona Under-15 team to victory in the Nike Premier Cup of 1999, scoring the winning goal in the last minute of the final, and was named player of the tournament. Just after Iniesta arrived at the club, then-captain Pep Guardiola famously told fellow midfielder Xavi: "You're going to retire me. This lad [Iniesta] is going to retire us all."

2004–2008 

Iniesta joined the first team during the tenure of Radomir Antić. On 29 October 2002, he made his first team debut in a 1–0 away win against Club Brugge in the UEFA Champions League group stage. In the 2004–05 season, he featured in 37 out of 38 league games—more than any other player—although 25 of these were substitute appearances. He scored twice as Barcelona won La Liga. An injury to Xavi at the start of the 2005–06 season allowed Iniesta more regular starts in the centre of midfield, and he continued to improve and develop. He played in 11 UEFA Champions League games, including a half-time appearance in the 2006 final, to replace Edmílson. His contribution to the team was praised by manager Frank Rijkaard as Barcelona won a league and Champions League double.

The 2006–07 season saw Iniesta's profile continue to rise and he earned plaudits for his willingness to play in any position for his team. In the pre-season, he lifted the Joan Gamper Trophy as the captain of the team after a 4–0 victory over German side Bayern Munich. Iniesta played for the first time as a left wing-forward for Barça in two Champions League matches against Levski Sofia, finding the net twice. In the first knockout stage of the same competition, he played in central midfield against Liverpool. Despite being moved around the pitch by manager Rijkaard, the 2006–07 season remains Iniesta's highest scoring thus far.

With the departure of Ludovic Giuly ahead of the 2007–08 campaign, Iniesta was able to switch his number 24 shirt for his preferred number 8. Despite rumours of a possible transfer before the season, he extended his contract to 2014 on 25 January 2008, with his buy-out clause being raised to €150 million. Don Balón, a member of European Sports Magazines, named Iniesta one of the most consistent performers in the previous two seasons of La Liga; he placed fifth in 2006–07 and fourth in 2007–08. He also placed ninth in the 2008 FIFA World Player of the Year voting, gaining 37 total points.

2008–09 
At the start of the 2008–09 season, in September 2008, Iniesta was elected the fourth-choice captain behind, in order of preference, Carles Puyol, Xavi and Víctor Valdés; all four were products of the Barcelona youth system. His performances throughout the season were highly lauded, and he received standing ovations both in Barcelona at the Camp Nou, as well as from rival supporters in away matches. A leg injury sustained in mid-November 2008 left Iniesta sidelined until 3 January; initially expected to return to action in six weeks, he did not want to come back until he was 100 percent. Upon his return to action on 3 January, as a 65th-minute substitute against Mallorca, he scored a crucial goal after just ten minutes on the pitch and completed a Barcelona comeback in front of the Camp Nou. 3 days later, he captained Barcelona for the first time in an official match, a 3–1 victory against Atlético Madrid at the Vicente Calderón in the round-of-16 first leg of the Copa del Rey.

Iniesta sustained another injury during a home match against Málaga, but returned to action for the first leg Champions League quarter-final against Bayern Munich on 8 April, which Barcelona won 4–0. He scored a vital equaliser in the final minute of stoppage time during the second leg of the Champions League semi-final against Chelsea, with a curling strike with the outside of his right foot 25 yards from goal, securing the tie on away goals as the match finished 1–1 at Stamford Bridge. In the season review, Un Any Al Paradis, Iniesta wrote, "I connected with that shot with the outside, not the inside or the tip of my boot, but right from my heart, with all my might."

Iniesta's goal against Chelsea sent Barcelona through to the final in Rome against defending champions Manchester United. Prior to the final, United manager Alex Ferguson identified Iniesta as Barça's biggest threat: "He's fantastic. He makes the team work. The way he finds passes, his movement and ability to create space is incredible. He's so important for Barcelona." Despite a thigh injury, Iniesta played and was influential in the game, providing the assist for the first goal scored by Samuel Eto'o as his team went on to win 2–0.<ref>McCarra, Kevin (27 May 2009). "Manchester United fold without a fight as Barcelona claim Champions League ", The Guardian. Retrieved 22 December 2010.</ref> In his analysis, David Pleat wrote, "In the end the midfield artistry of Iniesta and Xavi, helped by [Lionel] Messi, was the critical factor." After the game, United striker Wayne Rooney described Iniesta as the best player in the world.

Iniesta received plaudits for his performances that season; Don Balón rated him as the league's most consistent performer. Later that year, he placed fifth for the 2009 FIFA World Player of the Year award, with 134 votes, and fourth for the Ballon d'Or, receiving 149 points. Barcelona extended his contract by one year, until 2015, and raised his buy-out clause to €200 million.

 2009–2012 
Barcelona won a second successive league title in the 2009–10 season, securing a record 99 points. Individually, however, Iniesta endured a campaign largely disrupted by recurring injuries. He missed pre-season fitness training due to the thigh tear suffered in the 2009 Champions League final. Despite featuring in almost as many matches as the previous season, he did so mostly as a substitute, starting only 20 games throughout. His season came to a premature end in April after he aggravated a previous calf injury during training.

A contributing factor of Iniesta's fractured season were the episodes of psychological instability he suffered privately following the death of his close friend Daniel Jarque, a fellow footballer, in August 2009. Even when physically fit, he was often unable to complete training sessions or exert himself. After seeking psychological help, including from psychologist Inma Puig, he experienced catharsis when he scored Spain's match-winning goal in the 2010 FIFA World Cup final, which he dedicated to Jarque by revealing the message "Dani Jarque, always with us" written on his undershirt. "I did it because I felt it deeply," Iniesta said at the time. "It showed that what is more important than rivalry, your team or your colours is to be human and a good person. I am delighted because it was the most important moment in my career." Regarding the recurrent injuries that plagued his season, he said, "It was hard, but I will start with more desire than ever."

Iniesta scored his first goal of the 2010–11 season during the opening league fixture against Racing de Santander, lobbing the ball into the net from a distance of 30 yards. Throughout the campaign, he received standing ovations from opposition fans, including at El Sardinero and the Vicente Calderón Stadium, in appreciation of his World Cup-winning goal. Another standing ovation came on the home pitch of Espanyol in the Derbi barceloní, with the crowd acknowledging his friendship with Daniel Jarque, Espanyol's captain at the time of his death. Iniesta was one of the three finalists for the 2010 FIFA Ballon d'Or alongside Xavi and Messi, placing as runner-up behind the Argentine.

Iniesta started the 2011–12 season by scoring the opening goal in the second leg of the Supercopa de España against rivals Real Madrid. Barcelona went on to win the match 3–2 and the cup 5–4 on aggregate. One of his best goals followed in October against Viktoria Plzeň in the Champions League group stage after an interchange of passes with Messi. Iniesta played a record 51 matches unbeaten in La Liga, concluding with Barcelona's 2–0 defeat of Mallorca on 24 March. In the Champions League, he ended a goal drought by scoring a vital goal against Milan in the quarter-finals. From there, he went on to score in the semi-final against Chelsea to make the scoreline 2–0, but the match ended 2–2, eliminating his team 3–2 on aggregate. Towards the end of the year, on 25 November, Iniesta was named man of the match after scoring one goal and providing three assists in a 4–0 win over Levante. His performances earned him third place in the voting of the 2012 FIFA Ballon d'Or.

 2013–2018 
Iniesta signed a new contract with Barcelona in December 2013, keeping him at the club until 2018. As vice-captain, he regularly captained Barça throughout the club's second treble-winning campaign of the 2014–15 season, and became captain after Carles Puyol's retirement and Xavi's departure. Iniesta scored three times during the team's Copa del Rey campaign, and was man of the match in the 2015 UEFA Champions League Final, having assisted Ivan Rakitić's opening goal in the 3–1 defeat of Italian champions Juventus at Berlin's Olympiastadion. Their European victory made Barcelona the first club in history to win the treble of domestic league, domestic cup and European Cup twice; Iniesta was among the seven players to have been a part of both treble-winning teams.

During the first Clásico of the 2015–16 season, on 21 November, Iniesta became only the third Barcelona player, after Diego Maradona in 1983 and Ronaldinho in 2005, to receive applause from Real Madrid fans at the Santiago Bernabéu. His man-of-the-match performance included a goal and an assist, contributing to a resounding 4–0 victory.

He signed a lifetime contract with Barcelona on 6 October 2017, effectively keeping him with the club for the remainder of his career. He played the 650th game of his career for Barcelona against Levante on 7 January 2018, he was replaced by André Gomes after 76 minutes as the game ended 3–0 in favour of Barcelona.

Despite signing a lifetime contract, on 27 April 2018, Iniesta announced he would be leaving Barcelona by the end of the season. He made his 674th and final appearance for Barcelona on 20 May, in the final league match of the season, a 1–0 home victory over Real Sociedad, as Barcelona celebrated the victory of their 25th league and 30th Copa del Rey title; he came off in the 81st minute for Paco Alcácer.

 Vissel Kobe 
On 24 May 2018, Japanese club Vissel Kobe announced the signing of Iniesta on a three-year deal. He made his debut on 22 July, coming on as a second-half substitute for Kazuma Watanabe in a 0–3 defeat against Shonan Bellmare. On 11 August 2018, Iniesta scored his first goal in the J1 League in a 2–1 win over Jubilo Iwata.

On 21 December 2019, he scored the opening goal in a 3–1 win over Shimizu S-Pulse in the semi final of the 2019 Emperor's Cup. On 1 January 2020, he won his first trophy in Japan, starting in Vissel Kobe's 2–0 victory over Kashima Antlers in the final of the 2019 Emperor's Cup. A month later, he also won the 2020 Japanese Super Cup. On 7 December 2020, Iniesta suffered a tear of the rectus femoris muscle during a 2–0 win in the round of 16 of the 2020 AFC Champions League against Shanghai SIPG, in which he also scored the first goal of the game. He had a successful surgery in Barcelona a few days later.

On 11 May 2021, Iniesta signed a contract extension with Vissel Kobe, keeping him at the club for another two seasons. On 11 November 2021, he was named J.League Monthly MVP after scoring three league goals in October. He was named in the 2021 J.League Best XI on 6 December 2021.

On 14 May 2022, Iniesta scored a goal and guided Vissel Kobe to first league win of the 2022 season in a 4–0 win over Sagan Tosu.

 International career 
 2001–2008 
Iniesta burst on to the international scene in 2001, helping Spain win the UEFA European Under-16 Championship. After representing his country at the 2001 FIFA U-17 World Championship held in Trinidad and Tobago, he was in the squad that claimed the UEFA European Under-19 Championship the following year. From then, he became a regular choice for youth coach Juan Santisteban. In 2003, he was part of the side that reached the FIFA World Youth Championship final in the United Arab Emirates, and was named in the FIFA all-star team. During his spell with the Spain U21 side, Iniesta was named captain on several occasions.

Iniesta was called up to represent the senior Spain squad at the 2006 FIFA World Cup on 15 May 2006, much to the surprise of many. He won his first cap for La Furia Roja when he was brought on at half-time in a friendly against Russia on 27 May. His first goal followed in a friendly against England on 7 February 2007. His long-range effort, hitting the underside of the crossbar on the way in, gave Spain the lead on 63 minutes. Iniesta played a pivotal part in Spain's qualification for UEFA Euro 2008 by scoring goals against Sweden and by assisting the strikers.

 2008–2012 

Iniesta was selected in Spain's squad for UEFA Euro 2008 in Austria and Switzerland. Though a stomach ailment somewhat hampered his performances in the group stages, he still played an integral part in the midfield. He played in the first two of Spain's group stage matches and proved an important part of the team, providing a pass for David Villa's second goal against Russia. He was not rested, unlike most of Spain's regulars, for the final group game against Greece, which Spain won 2–1 thanks to a volley from Rubén de la Red and a late winner from Daniel Güiza. Iniesta returned for the quarter-final as Spain beat Italy on penalties; he was substituted before the penalty shootout itself. In the semi-final against Russia, he played the entire 90 minutes and produced a cross that Xavi converted to open the scoring in an eventual 3–0 victory; he was subsequently named the Man of the Match. He played the duration of the final in Spain's 1–0 win over Germany. Iniesta was named in the Team of the Tournament alongside fellow Spain midfielders Xavi, Marcos Senna and six other teammates. Iniesta did not participate in the 2009 FIFA Confederations Cup in South Africa due to a thigh muscle injury; Spain was eliminated from the tournament at the semi-final stage.

Iniesta was selected for Spain in the 2010 World Cup and scored the second goal in a 2–1 group stage win against Chile. He was also named man of the match. For his excellent performances in helping Spain reach the final of the tournament, Iniesta was shortlisted for the Golden Ball award. During the final, he scored the winning goal in the 116th minute of a 1–0 win against Netherlands. He earned a yellow card for removing his jersey during his ecstatic goal celebration to reveal his message to his late friend Dani Jarque. He won the man of the match award for his performance in the final, which gave Spain its first-ever World Cup.

At UEFA Euro 2012, Iniesta was awarded the man of the match award for his performances in three different matches. He was also selected as man of the match in the final against Italy, which Spain won 4–0. In winning the award, Iniesta became the only Spanish player to win the award at least once in each of Spain's three consecutive successful tournaments. Iniesta was also chosen as the UEFA Euro 2012 Player of the Tournament.

 2013–2018 
At the 2013 FIFA Confederations Cup, Iniesta was named in the Team of the Tournament and awarded the Silver Ball for the second best player in the competition, as Spain finished runner-up to host nation Brazil. Iniesta started all three matches for Spain at the 2014 World Cup, winning his 100th cap in the team's final group match against Australia. At the UEFA Euro 2016, he assisted the only goal of the match against Czech Republic and put in a man of the match display to give Spain a winning start in the tournament. He started in all four Spain's matches and were later knocked out by Italy in the Round of 16.

In May 2018, Iniesta was named in Spain's squad for the 2018 FIFA World Cup in Russia. He started in all three matches of the group stage, making an assist for Isco in the 2–2 draw against Morocco on 25 June 2018. He came off the bench in the 67th minute in Spain's last match at the tournament against Russia on 1 July 2018 for the round of 16. After the loss in the penalty shoot-outs, Iniesta announced his retirement from international duty. He amassed 131 senior international caps for Spain and at the time of retiring was the nation's fourth-most-capped player of all time, behind only Iker Casillas, Xavi, and Sergio Ramos.

 Style of play and reception 

Like fellow La Masia graduate Cesc Fàbregas, Iniesta originally started as a defensive midfielder, but his balance, ball control and agility in close spaces, allied with his skill, composure, and flair on the ball, saw him make progress as an attacking midfielder. Beyond his raw talent that was spotted at a young age by Barcelona's scouts, it was his great versatility, work ethic and inventiveness that allowed him to stake a claim on a first-team place at the age of 18. Vicente del Bosque described him as "A complete footballer. He can attack and defend, he creates and scores," and Frank Rijkaard said, "I played him as a false winger, central midfielder, deep midfielder and just behind the striker and he was always excellent." He was used initially as a wide-forward in the absence of Juan Román Riquelme and Ronaldinho by Louis van Gaal and Rijkaard respectively, but made his name as a world-class player in central midfield alongside or in lieu of Xavi, at both club and international level. As FIFA.com says, "It is in this position that his direct style and quick feet can be used to full effect, with the ball seeming glued to his toes as he races into threatening positions." A diminutive midfielder, Iniesta is a player known for his passing, technique, vision and movement; he is also highly regarded for his ability to read the game, as well as his acceleration, and close control at speed, which — when combined with his low centre of gravity — has rendered him one of the most skilled dribblers of all time, by allowing him to change direction quickly, get past opponents, and undertake individual runs with the ball, despite not being particularly quick. Moreover, his former manager Guardiola has praised him for "his mastery of the relationship between space and time," which he utilises to his advantage in order to disorient opposing players when in possession. His signature move is La Croqueta – a move pioneered by Michael Laudrup and popularised by Iniesta – where he quickly pushes the ball from his right foot to his left which takes the ball away from an opponent, allowing him to get out of a tight situation. His role has also been likened to that of a mezzala, in Italian football jargon, namely an offensive–minded box–to-box or central midfielder.

Much like other Barcelona youth products such as Pep Guardiola, Xavi and Iván de la Peña, Iniesta is a playmaker who relies on his technique, passing, intuition, movement and inventiveness to control the midfield, dictate the ebb and flow of play, and create chances or space for teammates. Iniesta has been praised for his understanding and interplay with Xavi; former Barcelona teammate Giovanni van Bronckhorst said of the pair, "They have a special relationship, they always have, they just seem to know where the other one is." Despite not being particularly prolific in front of goal, during his maturation as a player, he has gained a reputation of a big-game player for club and country, assisting a goal in each of the 2009, 2011 and 2015 UEFA Champions League finals, as well as scoring the winner in the 2010 World Cup Final, not to sideline his vital contributions in the 2006 Champions League Final, the 2008 Euro Final and the 2012 Euro Final, being known for his ability to score from powerful strikes outside the box. He is also the only footballer in history to win the Man of the Match award in a World Cup Final, a Euro Final, and a Champions League Final.

His willingness to play anywhere on the pitch has earned him the sobriquet El Ilusionista (The Illusionist), El Cerebro (The Brain), El Anti-Galáctico (a pun on Real Madrid players' nickname Los Galácticos), El Caballero Pálido (The Pale Knight) and most recently Don Andrés from the Spanish press. Zinedine Zidane also praised Iniesta, stating on the Spanish radio station Cadena COPE, "Iniesta really impresses me. He's got so much influence in Spain's game. He reminds me of myself." He is widely regarded by many in the sport as one of the most respected and best midfielders of all time, and as one of the greatest passers and playmakers in world football history. Despite his reserved personality, he was also known for his leadership.

 Media and sponsorship 
Iniesta had a sponsorship deal with sportswear company Nike, and has appeared in Nike commercials alongside Cristiano Ronaldo, Neymar, Zlatan Ibrahimović and Wayne Rooney. Iniesta features in EA Sports' FIFA video game series, and was the sixth-highest rated player in FIFA 15. Iniesta's signature move, La Croqueta, features in FIFA 19. In March 2015, Iniesta had the ninth highest social media rank in the world among sportspeople, with 24 million Facebook fans. On 22 October 2018, Iniesta signed a new sponsorship deal with Japanese sportswear company Asics, with his first signature boot being released on 15 July 2019.

 Personal life 
Iniesta is married to Anna Ortiz; the couple began dating in 2008 and wed on 8 July 2012. They have two daughters, born in 2011 and 2017, and two sons, born 2015 and 2019. They lost an unborn child, a son, due to miscarriage in March 2014. In February 2023, they welcomed their fifth child, a girl. Iniesta is a Catholic.

In 2011, Iniesta invested €420,000 in his boyhood club, Albacete, thus becoming its major shareholder. Two years later, with the club facing administrative relegation to the fourth tier of Spanish football, he loaned them a further €240,000 to cover unpaid wages.

In May 2018, Iniesta revealed to Risto Mejide that he suffered from depression before the 2010 FIFA World Cup due to his injuries and the death of Daniel Jarque. 
In September 2018, Iniesta alongside German footballer Lukas Podolski campaigned and donated money for the victims of the Hokkaido Eastern Iburi earthquake in Japan.

 Career statistics 
 Club 

Notes

 International Scores and results list Spain's goal tally first, score column indicates score after each Iniesta goal. Honours 
Barcelona
La Liga: 2004–05, 2005–06, 2008–09, 2009–10, 2010–11, 2012–13, 2014–15, 2015–16, 2017–18
Copa del Rey: 2008–09, 2011–12, 2014–15, 2015–16, 2016–17, 2017–18
Supercopa de España: 2005, 2006, 2010, 2011, 2013, 2016
UEFA Champions League: 2005–06, 2008–09, 2010–11, 2014–15
UEFA Super Cup: 2011, 2015
FIFA Club World Cup: 2009, 2011, 2015

Vissel Kobe
Emperor's Cup: 2019
Japanese Super Cup: 2020
Spain U16
UEFA European Under-16 Championship: 2001

Spain U19
UEFA European Under-19 Championship: 2002
Spain
FIFA World Cup: 2010
UEFA European Championship: 2008, 2012
Individual
UEFA Euro Team of the Tournament: 2008, 2012
La Liga Best Spanish Player: 2009
La Liga Best Midfielder: 2009, 2011, 2012, 2013, 2014
FIFA FIFPro World11: 2009, 2010, 2011, 2012, 2013, 2014, 2015, 2016, 2017
UEFA Team of the Year: 2009, 2010, 2011, 2012, 2015, 2016
Onze de Bronze: 2009
FIFA World Cup Dream Team: 2010
UEFA Champions League top assist provider: 2010–11
ESM Team of the Year: 2010–11, 2017–18
Onze d'Argent: 2011
Marca Legend Award: 2011
UEFA Best Player in Europe Award: 2012
UEFA Euro Player of the Tournament: 2012
IFFHS World's Best Playmaker: 2012, 2013
IFFHS World Team of the Decade 2011–2020
IFFHS UEFA Team of the decade 2011–2020
FIFA Confederations Cup Silver Ball: 2013
La Liga top assist provider: 2012–13
Golden Foot: 2014
UEFA Champions League Squad of the Season: 2014–15, 2015–16
UEFA Ultimate Team of the Year (published 2015)
FIFA Club World Cup Bronze Ball: 2015France Football'' World XI: 2015
La Liga Team of the Season: 2015–16
UEFA Euro All-time XI (published 2016)
J.League Best XI: 2019, 2021
Ballon d'Or Dream Team (Bronze): 2020

Decorations
Prince of Asturias Awards: 2010
Gold Medal of the Royal Order of Sporting Merit: 2011
Queen Sofia Award: 2017
Grand Cross of the Royal Order of Sports Merit: 2018

See also 
 List of footballers with 100 or more UEFA Champions League appearances
 List of men's footballers with 100 or more international caps
 List of men's footballers with the most official appearances
 List of celebrities who own wineries and vineyards 
 List of FC Barcelona players (150+ appearances)
 List of La Liga players (400+ appearances)

References

External links 

FC Barcelona official profile

National team data at BDFutbol

Blinkfire Analytics stats

1984 births
Living people
Sportspeople from the Province of Albacete
Spanish Roman Catholics
Spanish footballers
Footballers from Castilla–La Mancha
Association football midfielders
Albacete Balompié players
FC Barcelona Atlètic players
FC Barcelona players
Vissel Kobe players
Segunda División B players
La Liga players
J1 League players
UEFA Champions League winning players
UEFA Men's Player of the Year Award winners
Spain youth international footballers
Spain under-21 international footballers
Spain international footballers
Catalonia international guest footballers
2006 FIFA World Cup players
UEFA Euro 2008 players
2010 FIFA World Cup players
UEFA Euro 2012 players
2013 FIFA Confederations Cup players
2014 FIFA World Cup players
UEFA Euro 2016 players
2018 FIFA World Cup players
UEFA European Championship-winning players
FIFA World Cup-winning players
FIFA Century Club
Spanish expatriate footballers
Spanish expatriate sportspeople in Japan
Expatriate footballers in Japan